An election to the Islamic City Council of Tehran took place on 26 February 1999, along with the local elections nationwide.

The results showed a victory for the Reformist groupings, who won all of the seats.

Results

References

Tehran
1999
1990s in Tehran